Eidenberg is a municipality in the district of Urfahr-Umgebung in the Austrian state of Upper Austria, with 2105 inhabitants (as of 1 January 2018). The community is located in the judicial district Urfahr.

Population

References

Cities and towns in Urfahr-Umgebung District